Hugo (stylized as hugo) is the third studio album by English hip hop artist Loyle Carner. It was released via Virgin EMI Records on 28 October 2022.

Background
Three years passed between the release of Hugo and Carner's previous album, Not Waving, but Drowning. During this period he focussed on Chilli Con Carner, his cookery school for children with ADHD. His ongoing struggles with dyslexia and ADHD would inform the lyrical content of Hugo. He also released three singles in 2020: solo release "Yesterday," "I Wonder Why" with Joesef, and "Let It Go" with FARR and Flatbush Zombies producer Erick the Architect.

Songs
Carner's first child, a boy, was born in late 2020. He stated a desire for his music to be a "a true representation of the facts" for his son to look back on, documenting Carner's life as a young, Black, artist dealing with issues from his past. As a result, the lyrical content of Hugo is largely autobiographical. The album was written during the lockdown prompted by the COVID-19 pandemic. He also considered the introspective tone of the album to be in part due to this "hedonistic side of career being stripped away. There were no shows, no backstage, no festivals, no photoshoots."

Carner was influenced by Kendrick Lamar, saying "When you're young, there's a charm to the fact that you're a bit naive. You don't know what you're striving for. It's a balance because you don't want to be too old to feel connected to the culture of youth that you're trying to speak to. There's a sweet spot in the middle, like Kendrick with To Pimp a Butterfly, where you're naive enough to still be free-speaking, but considered enough to refine your shit." 

"Georgetown" was named after Carner's paternal grandmother's birthplace, and samples John Agard's poem "Half-Caste", which recounts the author's experiences of racism as a mixed race man in Britain. Issues of racism, and feeling separate from the Black community, are also present on "Hate". "Blood on my Nikes" recounts a murder Carner witnessed as a sixteen-year-old, and includes a speech on knife crime by teenage activist Athian Akec. Throughout the album he references his relationship with his estranged father, who he had recently developed a relationship with and recordings of whom's voice is sampled on several tracks.

Critical reception

Hugo was met with critical acclaim. At Metacritic, which assigns a normalized rating out of 100 to reviews from professional critics, the album received an average score of 87, based on 8 reviews. Writing in The Guardian, Damien Morris called the album a "beautiful, blistering masterpiece," praising the "intense" production and elements of jazz, as well as the subject matter. Fred Garratt-Stanley of the NME gave the album four stars out of five, named it Carner's "most polished record yet," singling out the production of Kwes for helping the rapper "move from dynamic, multi-syllabic storytelling to a more honest, reflective voice." Hayley Milross of The Line of Best Fit also praised the lyrical content, noting that the introspective themes "demonstrate some of Carner's finest and best work."

Year-end lists

Track listing
Track listing and credits adapted from Tidal and Discogs.

Sample credits
 "Hate" contains a sample of the recording "The Sun One" performed by Sun Ra.
 "Nobody Knows (Ladas Road)" contains a sample of the recording "Nobody Knows" performed by Pastor T. L. Barrett and The Youth For Christ Choir.
 "Georgetown" contains elements of the poem "Half-Caste" written and read by John Agard.
 "A Lasting Place" contains elements of the song "I Tried So Hard" by Gabriel Stebbing.

Charts

References

External links
 

2022 albums
Albums produced by Kwes
AMF Records albums
Loyle Carner albums
Virgin EMI Records albums